Sheetal Maulik     is an Indian television actress.

Filmography

Television

Short films

References

External links 
 
 

 

Actresses from Mumbai
Indian soap opera actresses
Indian television actresses
People from Mumbai
21st-century Indian actresses
Actresses in Hindi television
Living people
Year of birth missing (living people)